The Milutin Milankovic Medal is an annual award in Earth science presented by the European Geosciences Union (EGU). The award was introduced in 1993 by the European Geophysical Society (EGS). After a merger with the European Union of Geosciences in 2003, the award has been given by the Climate: Past, Present and Future Division. The medal is awarded to scientists for outstanding research in the field of long-term climate change and modeling. It is named after the Serb geophysicist Milutin Milanković in recognition of his academic and editorial services.

Recipients

 1993: Bert R. J. Bolin
 1994: André L. Berger
 1995: Jean-Claude Duplessy
 1996: Lennart Bengtsson
 1997: Jean Jouzel
 1998: Syukuro Manabe
 1999: Sir Nicholas J. Shackleton
 2000: Robert Sadourny
 2001: John E. Kutzbach
 2002: I. Colin Prentice
 2003: George Kukla, John Imbrie
 2004: Frederik Hilgen
 2005: Martin Claussen
 2006: Michael Sarnthein
 2007: Wang Pinxian
 2008: William Richard Peltier
 2009: Pascale Braconnot
 2010: James D. Hays
 2011: Andrey Ganopolski
 2012: Wolfgang Berger
 2013: Didier Paillard
 2014: Maureen E. Raymo
 2015: Paul J. Valdes
 2016: James C. Zachos
 2017: Axel Timmermann
 2018: David A. Hodell
 2019: Jacques Laskar
 2020: Valérie Masson-Delmotte
 2021: Ayako Abe-Ouchi
 2022: Hai Cheng
 2023: Bette L. Otto-Bliesner

References

Awards established in 1993